Mt. Shasta Brewing Company is a brewery in Weed, California. The company markets some brands as Weed Ales & Lagers. Owners Vaune and Barbara Dillmann began commercial production in 2003. Mount Shasta Brewing Company is licensed to distribute its beers in the states of California, Oregon, and Washington. The brewery has won awards for its beers, for local community involvement and for its marketing success with the slogan "Try Legal Weed".

History

Oakland Police officer Vaune V. Dillmann left Oakland in 1974 with his new bride, Barbara. The newlyweds settled near Mount Shasta; her family had earlier ties to land in the area. Vaune Dillmann purchased the Black Butte Saloon in central Weed and operated it for 25 years. During this time Dillmann helped sponsor the rebuilding of a large sign welcoming visitors to Weed, the sign arching over the town's main street leading to the saloon. Barbara M. Dillmann served for a time as Siskiyou County Superintendent of Schools.

Dillmann long wished to brew beer in the tradition of his German ancestors who settled in Milwaukee. In 1992, he bought the  Medo-Bel Creamery building in Weed three days before it was to be auctioned off. In renovating the 1952 building into a brewery, serious gasoline soil contamination was discovered, traced to leaking gasoline tanks and pump facilities used for decades to fuel Medo-Bel's fleet of trucks. Dillmann was granted $995,000 in state funds intended to remove contaminants from underground storage tanks, and the property was finally pronounced clean in May 1999.

The building took further improvements before beer could be made. Skylights were cut in the roof and the interior ceiling was clad in insulated plastic. Brewing equipment was brought from St. Paul, Minnesota—a 1938 24-barrel (740 gal, 2,800 L) brew kitchen outgrown by Summit Brewing Company—and from Davis, California, where Dillmann bought a modern 15-barrel (465 gal, 1,755 L) PUB system. The first commercial keg beer was brewed by Mt. Shasta Brewing in 2003: Weed Golden Ale. In 2005, the first batch of bottled beer was produced. In 2007, the brewery's Shastafarian Porter placed first in the Porter category in Sacramento at the California Brewers Festival. The next year at the Festival, the brewery's Mountain High IPA scored top India Pale Ale honors (edging out Bear Republic's highly regarded Racer 5 IPA), and their sour cherry-infused summer seasonal brew, Mt. Shasta Kriek Ale, came in third in the Fruit Beers category. Also in 2009, Mt. Shasta Brewing Company was named "Business of the Year" by the Weed Chamber of Commerce.

In 2003 two months before Mt. Shasta Brewing Company released its first product, Butte Creek Brewery in Chico, California, came out with a brew they patented as Mt. Shasta Pale Ale. Butte Creek sued for control of the trademark of Mt. Shasta Brewing Company, but Dillmann won the suit after a significant effort in proving his claim.

The brewery distributes its bottled beers to retailers and also serves beer in its tasting room and restaurant. The tasting room features an oak bar saved from Rosie's Saloon in nearby Fort Jones. Occasional specialty brews such as Strawberry Porter and Stout of Jefferson are only available at the tasting room. Being near the College of the Siskiyous is a boost to business, according to Dillmann, as is being near Interstate 5.

Mt. Shasta Brewing is one of three breweries in Siskiyou County, California. The other two are Dunsmuir Brewery Works and Etna Brewing Company.

Slogan controversy
Dillmann says he freely uses the town's name in his marketing by permission of the descendants of lumber baron Abner Weed, the town's founder and a state senator. Mt. Shasta Brewing Company's website domain is www.weedales.com, and "Weed Ales" is trademarked. Dillmann says the brewery relies on tourists for 92% of its business, and he uses the Weed name in double entendre, playfully, to promote the brand. Some of the company slogans are "Try Legal Weed", "A Friend in Weed Is a Friend Indeed" and "Weed – a flavor yet to be discovered."

The slogan "Try Legal Weed" has appeared on the bottle caps of each product in the brewery's line since 2008. In April 2008, the company was ordered to remove the slogan by the Alcohol and Tobacco Tax and Trade Bureau (ATTTB) because of the perceived endorsement of an illegal drug. The Dillmanns argued that they should be allowed to exercise their freedom of speech, and that the slogan refers to the town of Weed and advertises a legal product. Dillmann said he has never in his life tried marijuana (also known as "weed"). Dillmann was invited to speak about the issue on regional and national television programs, local radio shows, and he was interviewed by reporters from many countries. The American Civil Liberties Union (ACLU) expressed their intention to challenge the ruling on the basis of the First Amendment guaranteeing freedom of speech, but in October 2008 ATTTB reversed their decision after additional review.

Upon hearing the news, Dillmann said, "Weed fought the law, and Weed won." The following year, the Dillmanns were honored by the United States Commerce Association's Best of Local Business Award Program for positive contributions to the local community and their marketing success in the battle to retain the slogan.

Beers
Main brews
Abner Weed Amber Ale
Lemurian Lager
Mountain High IPA
Shastafarian Porter
Weed Golden Ale
Jalapeño Ale

Seasonal brews
 Skip and Go Naked
 Sour Diesel 
 Stout of Jefferson
 Abner Weed's Apple Pie Ale
 530 Mt Shasta Pale Ale

References

External links
 
 May 2008 gallery, photographs by Jakob Schiller of the Los Angeles Times

Beer brewing companies based in California
Companies based in Siskiyou County, California
American companies established in 2003
Food and drink companies established in 2003
2003 establishments in California
Privately held companies based in California